

Human environmental sciences

!